The Fifth Cabinet of Khayreddin Ahdab was the 12th cabinet in the French mandate on Lebanon, headed by Khayreddin al-Ahdab for the fifth consecutive time. Although it is a reshuffle, it is considered a new cabinet at the request of the Constitutional Bloc. President Émile Eddé appointed three ministers affiliated with the National Bloc following the resignation of three ministers, two of which were Constitutionals. It won the confidence of the Parliament on 18 January 1938, with 38 votes in favour, 13 against, 5 abstentions and 6 absents. On 21 March, Prime Minister al-Ahdab resigned.

Composition

References 

Cabinets established in 1938
Cabinets disestablished in 1938
Cabinets of Lebanon
1938 establishments in Lebanon
1938 disestablishments in Lebanon